Leandro Lourenço Franco (born August 10, 1981 in Pouso Alegre), commonly known as Lê, is a Brazilian football forward.

Club career
After playing with South American giants Colo-Colo, he got offers to play in well known Mexican teams, such as Cruz Azul. Then went on to play in Super League Greece team Atromitos. His team relegated to Beta Ethniki, so he looked for new options. He finally got an offer to play for Águila, one of the biggest clubs in El Salvador and Central America. In 2009, he signed a one-year contract with fellow Salvadorans Luis Ángel Firpo. Then, in 2010 he moved back to his native Brazil to play with Marília Atlético Clube only to join Sport Boys in Peru in 2011.

References 

sambafoot 
paginas.terra 

1981 births
Living people
Brazilian footballers
Brazilian expatriate footballers
Associação Atlética Internacional (Limeira) players
Paulista Futebol Clube players
Rio Branco Sport Club players
Colo-Colo footballers
Guarani FC players
Atromitos F.C. players
C.D. Águila footballers
C.D. Luis Ángel Firpo footballers
Sporting Cristal footballers
Expatriate footballers in Chile
Expatriate footballers in Greece
Expatriate footballers in El Salvador
Expatriate footballers in Peru
Association football midfielders